Władysław Dutkiewicz (21 February 1918 in Stara Sil, Ukraine, then in Poland – 2 October 1999 in Adelaide) was a Polish-born naturalized Australian artist and Polish language playwright, winning multiple awards as a painter. He emigrated to Australia in 1949.

He was a painter, sculptor, actor, stage designer, and theatre director. Two of four brothers were also artists: Jan Dutkiewicz (1911-1985, Poland) and Ludwik Dutkiewicz (1921-2008, Australia). He had five children, three of whom have careers as artists: Michal (now a commercial artist), Adam (art critic, historian & painter) & Ursula Dutkiewicz (ceramist & sculptor).

Studies
Academy of Fine Arts, Kraków, Poland, 1935–1937; École des Beaux-Arts, Paris, 1937–1938; Great Theatre, Lwów, Poland 1939.

Career
Throughout the war he worked for the Polish Resistance, and was taken prisoner by both the Soviets and the Nazis. His exhibitions of mostly expressionist and abstract paintings 1946-1996 included ninety solo and group exhibitions, among the latter in Germany, 1946; England, 1954, 1961; and America, 1961; as well as the Olympic Games, National Gallery of Victoria, 1956; Survey 1, NGV, 1958; 1st Helena Rubinstein Travelling Art Scholarship, Art Gallery of New South Wales, 1958; Tasmanian Museum and Art Gallery, 1959; Heide Museum of Modern Art, Melbourne, 1961, 1996–1997; New Directions, Newcastle City Art Gallery, New South Wales, 1962; Critics' Choice, Contemporary Art Society, Adelaide, 1967; South Australian painters, Adelaide Festival Centre (AFC), 1974; 50 Years of SA Art, Art Gallery of South Australia (AGSA), 1978; Painting in South Australia Today, AGSA, 1981; Five Polish Artists in Adelaide, AFC, 1986; Polish-Australian Artists, AFC 1994–1995; Charles Nodrum Gallery, Melbourne, 1985, 1990; Adelaide Town Hall, 1993–94; 20th Century Style: Furniture, AGSA, 2003; and two or three person exhibitions at Royal SA Society of Arts Gallery, Adelaide, 1951; University of Adelaide, 1966; and Kensington Gallery, Adelaide 1991.

On arriving in Adelaide he designed sets for several plays, then from 1956, following injuries received in a traffic accident for some years was forced to give up painting and returned to stage production. Drawing on war-time experience as a director of the Great Theatre, Lwow, and of his own theatre in DP camps in Bavaria after the war he formed the Art Studio Players in Adelaide, working with the "Method", 1959–62. He also directed two plays for the Adelaide University Theatre Guild, in 1959 and 1967, and later appeared as an actor in several television dramas for Crawford Productions in Melbourne. In the 1950s and 60s he was widely regarded as a leader of the modernist movement in Adelaide. He held retrospective exhibitions at RSASA in 1961; at Lidums Gallery, Adelaide, 1974; Greenhill Galleries, 1989; Hilton International Hotel, 1991; RSASA, 1993, 2005; and BMG Art, 1996.

Awards
Cornell Prize (CAS of SA) 1951, 55, runner-up 1953; finalist Blake Prize for Religious Art 1956, finalist Dunlop Prize 1955; several gold and silver medals, Royal Adelaide Exhibitions 1952, 1957; shared Advertiser Prize with Erica McGilchrist, 1956; finalist Helena Rubinstein Travelling Art Scholarship Exhibition 1958; South Australian government grant 1976, 1993.

Reputation

The Vatican; Australian National Collection (now Artbank); AGSA; NGV; TMAG; Newcastle Region Art Gallery; MoMA at Heide; Hamilton Art Gallery; University of Queensland; Flinders University; State Library of South Australia; Riddoch Art Gallery, Mount Gambier art gallery.

References

1918 births
1999 deaths
Australian artists
Polish artists
20th-century Polish dramatists and playwrights
20th-century Polish male writers
Polish male dramatists and playwrights
Polish emigrants to Australia